Chickie’s & Pete’s is an American bar and restaurant business privately owned and headquartered in Philadelphia, Pennsylvania. It started as a small privately owned neighborhood taproom in 1977, and created a brand name as a seafood crab house that expanded from a single location to multiple locations within the Philadelphia Metropolitan Area. In 2011, ESPN voted Chickie's & Pete's the number one sports bar in North America.

History
Peter and Henrietta Ciarrocchi owned a deli, and in 1977, purchased a nearby small neighborhood taproom on Robbins Avenue, in the Mayfair section of northeast Philadelphia known as "Wally's". Peter made three changes by adding stools to the standing-only bar, lifting the “men only” rule, and naming the bar after himself and his wife, Henrietta, whom everyone called Chickie.

When Peter died in 1987, it was Chickie who encouraged Peter's son, Pete Junior, to run with his own business ideas, his spin on crab seasoned fries, and whatever else he wanted to try. In 1998, Pete expanded the business by purchasing a run-down vacant supermarket building near Veterans Stadium within the Sports Complex Special Services District in Packer Park in South Philadelphia to build upon the sports bar concept by locating near Philadelphia's sport venues.

In February 2016, Herr Foods Inc. released Chickie's & Pete's Crabfries seasoned potato chips.

Lawsuits
Chickie’s and Pete’s trademarked the phrase “crab fries” in 2007. The owner of the company, Pete Ciarrocchi, has been “passionate about defending that trademark.”

A federal lawsuit was filed in U.S. District Court in Philadelphia on Oct. 27, 2011, alleging that New York J & P Pizza in Westminster, Maryland was guilty of trademark infringement and unfair competition due to their use of the term "crab fries" on a 2007 online menu. A similar lawsuit was filed, also in 2011, against Crabby Fries in Kill Devil Hills, North Carolina. Other restaurants, including Sidecar Bar & Grille in Philadelphia and another restaurant in Maryland, have voluntarily removed the offending terms rather than face a lawsuit.

Not every restaurant has agreed to discontinue their usage of this phrase. Crabby Fries is fighting the lawsuit threat by noting that they are 400 miles from Chickie's & Pete's primary market, and arguing that the terms 'crab' and 'fries' are too generic to be trademarked.
In August 2012, during an out of court settlement through a mediator, Crabby Fries agreed to take "crabby fries” off their menu, but will operate under the name Crabby Fries for an undisclosed amount of time.

In February 2014, Chickie's & Pete's agreed to pay $8.5 million to settle both a Labor Department investigation and a lawsuit brought by current and former employees alleging wage and labor law violations. Ciarrocchi said that he agreed to the massive settlement because "it was the right thing to do".

Locations
As of March 2019, Chickie & Petes had 19 Crab House and Sports Bar locations; multiple facilities at Lincoln Financial Field (home of the Eagles Football team) and other venues provide a total of 37 sales sites.

Xfinity Live!, located at Philadelphia's Sport Complex, announced in December 2011 the development of a new food court and additional restaurants that would include a Chickie & Petes.

Miscellaneous
In 2011, Pete Jr. became part-owner of the Philadelphia Soul arena football team.

References

External links
 

Restaurants established in 1977
Entertainment companies of the United States
Companies based in Philadelphia
Drinking establishments in Pennsylvania
Restaurants in Philadelphia
Restaurants in New Jersey
Regional restaurant chains in the United States
Video arcades
1977 establishments in Pennsylvania